The Ministry of Economy of the Republic of Serbia is the ministry in the Government of Serbia which is in the charge of economy. The current minister is Rade Basta, in office since 26 October 2022.

History
The Ministry of Economy was established on 3 March 2004 after the dissolution of the Ministry of Privatization and Economic Reconstruction which existed from 1991 to 2004.

The Ministry of Foreign Economic Relations which existed from 1991 to 2007, merged into the Ministry of Economy and Regional Development in 2007.

Over the years, it has changed many secondary areas of its jurisdiction. Regional development was added in 2007, and later the Ministry of National Investment Plan merged into the Ministry of Economy and Regional Development in 2011.

The Ministry of Economy was reunified from 2012 to 2013 with the Ministry of Finance under Mlađan Dinkić. At the same time, Regional Development was joined with the Local-Self Government into unified ministry (later Ministry of Public Administration and Local Self-Government).

In 2013, Ministry of Economy was once again split from Finance under Saša Radulović.

Sectors
There are several sectors operating within the Ministry:
 Sector for economic development
 Item list with tags
 Sector for development of small and medium enterprises and entrepreneurship
 Sector for quality infrastructure
 Sector for international cooperation and European integration
 Sector for privatization and bankruptcy
 Sector for control, supervision and administrative affairs in the field of public enterprises and business registers
 Sector for investments in infrastructure projects

Subordinate institutions
There are several agencies and institutions that operate within the scope of the Ministry:
 Directorate for Measures and Precious Metals
 Agency for Business Registers
 Development Agency of Serbia
 Accreditation body of Serbia
 Institute for Standardization of Serbia
 Agency for licensing of bankruptcy administrators
 Insurance and Financing Agency of Serbia
 Agency for the conduct of disputes in the privatization process
 Development Fund

List of ministers
Political Party:

|-
! colspan=8| Minister of Economy
|-

|-
! colspan=8| Economy and Regional Development
|-

|-
! colspan=8| Minister of Finance and Economy
|-

|-
! colspan=8| Minister of Economy
|-

See also
 Ministry of Industry (1991–2001)
 Ministry of Privatization and Economic Reconstruction (1991–2004)
 Ministry of Foreign Economic Relations (1991–2007)
 Ministry of National Investment Plan (2007–2011)

References

External links
 
 Serbian ministries, etc – Rulers.org

Economy
2004 establishments in Serbia
Ministries established in 2004
Serbia